Ganga Jamuna Temple is a Hindu pilgrimage site in Nepal where a famous fair is held around the temple before three days of full moon day during the first week of November. Here is a holy stone which is highly revered by the Hindu devotees and local people. It is believed that this holy stone preserves the divine power as water originates from there.

References

Hindu pilgrimage sites in Nepal